Defending champion Serena Williams defeated Angelique Kerber in the final, 7–5, 6–3 to win the ladies' singles tennis title at the 2016 Wimbledon Championships. It was her seventh Wimbledon singles title and 22nd major singles title overall, equaling Steffi Graf's Open Era record. Williams lost just one set during the tournament, to Christina McHale in the second round.

This was also the first time two women contested multiple major finals in the same season since Amélie Mauresmo and Justine Henin-Hardenne met in the 2006 Australian Open and Wimbledon finals, as Williams and Kerber had contested the 2016 Australian Open final.

This marked the first Wimbledon where no two fellow countrywomen faced off in the first round, meaning no country was guaranteed to have a player in the second round.
 
In addition to Williams and Kerber, Garbiñe Muguruza, Agnieszka Radwańska and Simona Halep were in contention for the world No. 1 ranking. Williams retained the top spot by reaching the fourth round. She also spent her 300th week atop the WTA rankings during the second week of the tournament, and won her 300th major match by defeating Annika Beck in the third round.

At 36 years old, Venus Williams became the oldest woman to reach a major semifinal since Martina Navratilova at the 1994 Wimbledon Championships.

Seeds

Qualifying

Draw

Finals

Top half

Section 1

Section 2

Section 3

Section 4

Bottom half

Section 5

Section 6

Section 7

Section 8

Championship match statistics

References

External links
 Women's Singles draw
2016 Wimbledon Championships – Women's draws and results at the International Tennis Federation

Women's Singles
Wimbledon Championship by year – Women's singles
2016 in women's tennis
Wimbledon